Brazilian Western is a 2013 Brazilian crime drama film directed and produced by René Sampaio, starring Fabrício Boliveira, Isis Valverde and César Troncoso. It is based on the song of same name released by Brazilian rock band Legião Urbana in their 1987 Que País É Este album.

Originally set for a 2011 release, the film's production suffered many delays. Shootings for the film took place primarily in the Jardim ABC neighbourhood of Cidade Ocidental, Goiás, in which the city of Ceilândia, Distrito Federal was recreated as it was in the 1970s. Shootings of other cities and places mentioned in the song could be done in loco. The film was screened in the Contemporary World Cinema section at the 2013 Toronto International Film Festival.

Plot 
João do Santo Cristo (Fabrício Boliveira) was raised in the countryside of Bahia by his parents on a poor, small farm. His father was shot and killed by a police officer as a punishment for hurting the cop's brother, who was himself hurting João earlier for trying to steal candy. When João is older, his mother dies and he decides to leave home for Brasília, to meet a relative he discovered by looking at some old pictures. Before leaving town, however, he executes his father's killer and is caught by police at the bus stop. After doing time in prison, he is finally able to go to Brasília.

Upon arriving in Brasília, he meets his cousin Pablo (César Troncoso) and start doing small illegal tasks for him, such as delivering drugs. Pablo also gives him weapons (including the Winchester 22 cited in the eponymous song). He also starts working at a local carpentry to earn some money. One of his drug delivery operations goes wrong and is stormed by the police. In order to escape, he manages to break into an apartment. There, he meets Maria Lúcia (Isis Valverde), a punk music enthusiast and daughter of a senator. Despite the circumstances, they end up falling in love after João visits her one more time and asks her out.

When Maria Lúcia shows her friend the marijuana João can provide, they immediately like it and ask for more. This upsets Jeremias (Felipe Abib), the local drug dealer, and he tries to have João killed with the help of his partner and corrupt police officer Marco Aurélio (Antônio Calloni). Maria disapproves João's criminal activities and demands him to stop. He promises Maria he will stop committing crimes, but he and Pablo start a new drug empire in Brasília taking advantage of the better marijuana they can offer.

In order to regain their respect and market around the city, Jeremias and his allies organize a "rockonha" (a portmanteau of “Rock” (the musical genre) and “Maconha” (marijuana), it refers to a party with rock’n’roll music and marijuana), and João is invited. Upon arriving, he is chased by Jeremias and his two henchmen. The trio corners João at the edge of a hill, but Pablo and a friend were already waiting nearby. Jeremias turns the tables once again in his favor and reveals that he has several criminals and corrupt officers covering him. Pablo pushes João down the hill and sacrifices himself to buy João some time.

João ends up captured anyway and is taken to prison. There, he spends several days, and each day he is ordered to hold a newspaper in front of him so Marco can photograph both. One day, during this task, João manages to grab hold of Marco and sets himself and all other prisoners free. He then executes Marco and heads for a final assault on Jeremias and his drug empire. He starts by killing Jeremia's right handman and stealing all his cocaine, leaving a message daring Jeremias to a duel.

At the assigned place, Jeremias finds three final bags of his cocaine hanging from a football goal. When he approaches the bags, João shoots them. They both stare at each other. Maria arrives with João's Winchester .22 and aims it at Jeremias. While João looks at her, Jeremias takes the moment to shoot him. With João, shot and on the ground, Maria kneels by João's side, and Jeremias shoots her as well. Jeremias then turns around to check on his wasted cocaine. João, still breathing, loads his Winchester and shoots Jeremias five times, killing him. The film ends with João and Maria lying dead beside each other and with scenes of them together and João's narration.

In a post-credits scene, an alternate, more song-loyal ending is presented, with João and Jeremias about to duel in front of a crowd, as originally described in the song. It ends with both drawing out their guns and pointing them at each other, while Maria is shown having a brief spasm.

Cast
 Fabrício Boliveira as João de Santo Cristo
 Ísis Valverde as Maria Lúcia
 Felipe Abib as Jeremias
 Antônio Calloni as Marco Aurélio
 César Troncoso as Pablo
 Cinara Leal as Teresa
 Marcos Paulo as Ney
 Rômulo Augusto as Saci
 Juliana Lohmann as Cris
 Rodrigo Pandolfo as Beto
 Max Lima as young Santo Cristo

Production

Development 
In July 2005, O Globo informed that production on Faroeste Caboclo had started and was being led by director René Sampaio. According to him, he wanted to watch a movie based on the song, and found it funny that he was involved in the production of such film. He described it as a "Greek tragedy".

The first contracts to initiate the writing process were done with Russos's family, which approved it. However, in early 2007, Editora Tapajós tried to legally stop the production of the film, stating that it has been holding the song's copyrights for more than 20 years, and saying that the family could not negotiate the movie without their permission.
 The final decision of the Superior Court of Justice came on January 1, 2007, declining Tapajós's request to make the film. Since then, the producers spent some time trying to raise funds for the movie.

Casting 

The main cast of the movie was confirmed on February 9, 2011. Fabrício Boliveira was chosen to play the main role, João de Santo Cristo; Ísis Valverde was confirmed as his love interest Maria Lúcia; and Felipe Adib will be the antagonist Jeremias. On April 15, 2011, Cinara Leal was chosen to play Teresa, since Fabiula Nascimento had to leave the film due to her busy schedule.

César Troncoso, husband of Teresa, was confirmed on 23 May 2011. About his character, he commented:

Filming 
Filming began on April 12, 2011. The first scene shot was when João de Santo Cristo arrives at Brasília. The production team had to alter the highway so that it resembled the appearance from the 70s. Also, the crew found a 1955 city bus that had been functioning in the capital since its foundation, and used it in the film.

The movie was shot in Brasília and in the countryside of São Paulo state. At the border of the Federal District with Goiás, a set city was built in order to recreate Ceilândia as it was in the 80s. The set was built in an empty terrain belonging to a landfill company.

References

External links
 
 

2013 films
2010s Portuguese-language films
2013 crime drama films
Brazilian crime drama films
Films based on songs
Films set in Brazil
Films shot in Brasília
Legião Urbana